Vanessa Olivia Ezenwa is an American ecologist who is a professor at the Odum School of Ecology at the University of Georgia. Her research considers the ecology of infectious diseases amongst animal populations. In 2020, she was selected by The Community of Scholars as one of the most Inspiring Black scientists in the United States.

Early life and education 
As a high school student, Ezenwa became interested in infectious diseases and ecology. Ezenwa earned her bachelor's degree at Rice University. She was a graduate student at Princeton University, where she majored in behavioral ecology. Her doctoral research considered eleven different species of African ungulate in Kenya. Some of these ungulates lived in pairs, whilst some lived in groups of one hundred. After completing her doctorate, Ezenwa joined the United States Geological Survey as a postdoctoral fellow.

Research and career 
In 2005, Ezenwa joined the faculty at the University of Montana. She moved to the University of Georgia in 2010. Her research considers infectious diseases in animal populations, with a particular focus on identifying effective intervention strategies. She has studied how gastrointestinal worm infections impact the susceptibility of African buffalo to contract bovine tuberculosis, and how severe their diseases are once they have become infected. She concentrated her studies on the free ranging buffalo of Kruger National Park, but the buffalo are a major reservoir of bovine tuberculosis infections in South Africa. The prevalence of the disease in Africa can impact other wildlife. Ezenwa demonstrated that it was possible to treat the worms, diminishing the severity of tuberculosis and increasing the likelihood infected animals survive. Unfortunately, because infected animals survive better, they are more likely to spread the disease. Ezenwa has investigated non-pharmaceutical approaches to managing infectious diseases amongst animals, such as test and cull programmes. Beyond African buffalo, Ezenwa studied Grant's gazelle and spiny mice. Ezenwa has investigated the influence of climate change and changing weather on infectious diseases amongst livestock.

Ezenwa serves on the editorial advisory board of Science. In 2020, Ezenwa was selected by The Community of Scholars as one of the most inspiring Black scientists in the United States.

Selected publications

References 

Living people
Year of birth missing (living people)
African-American scientists
Rice University alumni
Princeton University alumni
University of Georgia faculty
American ecologists
Women ecologists
American environmentalists
21st-century African-American people